Weliton Santos do Amaral (born 13 April 2005), simply known as Weliton, is a Brazilian footballer who plays as a forward for Juventude.

Club career
Born in Soledade, Rio Grande do Sul, Weliton joined Juventude's youth setup in 2016, aged eleven. He made his first team – and Série A – debut on 3 September 2022, coming on as a late substitute for Chico in a 1–1 home draw against Avaí.

Career statistics

References

External links
Juventude profile 

2005 births
Living people
Sportspeople from Rio Grande do Sul
Brazilian footballers
Association football forwards
Campeonato Brasileiro Série A players
Esporte Clube Juventude players